Kao may refer to:

Mythology 
 Kao (bull), a supernatural divine bull in Meitei mythology, captured by Khuman Khamba

Places
 Käo, Saare County, Estonia, a village
 Käo, Tartu County, Estonia, a village
 Kao, Indonesia, a town
 Kao, Lesotho, a community council
 Kao, Niger, a village and rural commune
 Kao, Togo, a village
 Kao (island), Tonga
 Kao (crater), a lunar crater

People
 Gao (surname), sometimes romanized as Kao
 Kaō (painter) ), Japanese painter
 R. N. Kao (1918–2002), Indian spymaster, first chief of India's external intelligence agency, the Research and Analysis Wing

Acronym
 Kuiper Airborne Observatory
 Keith-Albee-Orpheum, abbreviated KAO or K-A-O, owners of an American chain of vaudeville and motion picture theatres
 Communist Workers Organisation (Netherlands) (Kommunistische Arbeidersorganisatie)

Other uses
 Kao language, of Indonesia
 Kaō, a stylized signature or a mark used in place of a signature in East Asia
 Kao Corporation, a Japanese chemical and cosmetics company
 Kaō (era), a Japanese era name
 Kao (film), a 2000 film by Junji Sakamoto
 Kuusamo Airport, Finland, IATA airport code
 Kao the Kangaroo, a series of video games

See also
 Kappa Alpha Theta (ΚΑΘ), a sorority at DePauw University